The following is a list of songs written or performed by anti folk artist Regina Spektor.

Spektor as lead artist and songwriter (115)

In Soviet Kitsch, there is a brief spoken word piece titled “Whisper”, in which Spektor and her brother, Barry (Bear) Spektor, discuss the following song on the album ("Your Honor").

Two tracks from Songs were later re-recorded and re-released by Spektor. The first, "Samson", also appeared in Begin to Hope. The second, "Ne Me Quitte Pas", was featured in What We Saw from the Cheap Seats, retitled as "Don't Leave Me (Ne Me Quitte Pas)". Unlike the 2002 version, which featured only Spektor and the piano, the 2012 one also includes a drum machine, horns and brass instruments.

A third version of "Ne Me Quitte Pas" was also released online, keeping the new, multi-instrument production, but replacing the English verses with Russian lyrics. The new rendition was titled "Не Покидай Меня".

Two of the tracks from Home, Before and After were previously only available through unofficial sources. "Raindrops" was an unreleased demo and "Loveology" was only performed live.

Spektor as featured artist (13)

Songs on this list feature Regina Spektor working with other artists. Most of them were not released by her.

Spektor has also recorded spoken introductions for the songs in The Crimea's album Secrets of the Witching Hour, as well as a guest narration for Quodia's album The Arrow.

Cover songs officially released (13)

Unreleased demos (14)

 "A Cannon"
 "Ave Maria"
 "Back In"
 "BYOS (Bring Your Own Shovel)"
 "Chicken Song"
 "Cinderella"
 "Dead of Night"
 "I Cut Off My Hair"
 "Just Like the Movies"
 "Paris"
 "Pure Perfection"
 "Rockland County"
 "School is Out"
 "The Soup"

Six songs from this collection came from a cassette tape that was auctioned online in 2007. The track list is 1. Chicken Song, 2. Braille, 3. Love Affair, 4. Cinderella, 5. School is Out and 6. Sunshine. Regina gave the tape to a family friend who was in the music business.

Unreleased live songs (39)

 "8th Floor"
 "AB"
 "Amplifiers"
 "Aquarius"
 "Be Like a Cloud"
 "Bear Spektor"
 "Begin to Hope"
 "Belt"
 "The Big Towns"
 "The Bronx"
 "By the Time You Read This Letter"
 "The Clocks Were Asleep"
 "A Cooler Version of Yourself"
 "Cradle"
 "Cyclone"
 "Dead Rat"
 "The Devil Came to Bethlehem"
 "Dog and Pony"
 "Dulce et Decorum est Pro Patria Mori"
 "Dust to Dust"
 "The Floor Heard Everything"
 "Happy Hooker"
 "In the Studio"
 "Ink Stains"
 "Left Hand Song (A Lesson in How Fleeting Preservation Is)"
 "Little Girls"
 "Long Brown Hair"
 "Lucky Penny"
 "Making Records"
 "Men" (other titles: "Eternal Life is a Drag", "Walk on Water")
 "Mermaid"
 "The Mustard Musketeers"
 "One-String Blues"
 "Party Upstairs" (with Jack Dishel)
 "Quarters"
 "Reginasaurus"
 "Secret Stash (No One)"
 "Soho"
 "A Space-Time Fairytale"
 "Train Ballad"
 "Trigger Happy"
 "Uncle Bobby"
 "The Virgin Queen"
 "Woolen Gloves"
 "You"

Unreleased songs covered live (7)

 "Chelsea Hotel #2" (Leonard Cohen cover)
 "Halikha LeKesariya"
 "Hallelujah" (Leonard Cohen cover)
 "Love Profusion" (Madonna cover)
 "Mr. Tambourine Man"
 "It's All Over Now, Baby Blue" (Bob Dylan cover, with "Cabin Down Below Band", May 25, 2012, Dylanfest 2012, Irving Plaza, New York, NY)
 "Moon River" (with Lang Lang (pianist) and orchestra performing at the Lincoln Center, Rose Theater on May 3, 2016 for ”New York Rhapsody”)

References

Spektor, Regina